Kreis Krotoschin was a county in the southern administrative district of Posen, in the Prussian province of Posen. It presently lies in the southern part of Polish region of Greater Poland Voivodeship.

Civil registry offices 
In 1905, these civil registry offices served the following towns in Kreis Krotoschin:

External links

Districts of the Province of Posen